Savage Beauty is a South African drama series that was released on 12 May 2022 on Netflix. The series was written by Lebogang Mogashoa. The series is about the mystery woman who enmeshes herself in a strong family that controls a global beauty empire and is hiding some dark secrets in order to exact retribution for her tragic past.

Plot 
Savage Beauty revolves around Bhengu Beauty (the global beauty empire) and Zinhle (the face of the brand) who has come to avenge the Bhengu family. The public is unaware that Don and Grace Bhengu's lucrative beauty business was founded on the immoral practice of testing a skin-lightening product on children. That is, until one of the two survivors, Zinhle Manzini, arrives 15 years later to reveal them and reduce their dominion to ashes.

Cast

Main
 Rosemary Zimu as Zinhle Manzini
 Dumisani Mbebe as Don Bhengu
 Nthati Moshesh as Grace Bhengu
 Angela Sithole as Thando Bhengu
 Jesse Suntele as Phila Bhengu
 Nambitha Ben-Mazwi as Linda Bhengu
 Oros Mampofu as Ndu Bhengu
 Mpho Sebeng as Bonga

Recurring
 Vaughn Lucas as Peter
 John Ncamane as Kolobe
 Tina Redman as Zandi
 Nandi Mbatha as Ruby
 Didintle Khunou as Vee
 Thami Ngoma as Regina
 Khutjo Green as Chief Nurse
 Slindile Nodangala as Gogo Simphiwe
 Bridget Masinga as Bhengu PR Person
 Eve Rasimeni as Nurse Noni
 Vele Manenje as Makhosi Mnisi
 Mnatha Vika as Doctor

Episodes

References

External links
 
 

2022 South African television series debuts
2022 South African television series endings
South African drama television series
English-language Netflix original programming
Sotho-language television shows
Television series about revenge